Typhlocoela is a subclass of ctenophores.

References

Tentaculata